Aattakatha may refer to:

Aattakatha (performance), story for dancing and acting
Aattakatha (1987 film), Malayalam film released in 1987 starring Ratheesh and Anjali Naidu
Aattakatha (2013 film), Malayalam film released in 2013 starring Vineeth and Meera Nandan